Abono (from Ilocano for 'fertilizer') is a political organization in the Philippines which had party-list representation in the House of Representatives of the Philippines. In the May 14, 2007 election, the party won one seat in the nationwide party-list vote.

As a party-list it intends to represent the agriculture and marginalized sector especially the population of the La Union province.

Electoral performance

The Abono Party-list occupied one seat in the 18th Congress of the Philippines:

Conrado M. Estrella III

The chair and treasurer of Abono is Engr. Rosendo O. So, while the national president is Poncianso V. Onia Jr.

References

Politics of La Union
Politics of Pangasinan
Party-lists represented in the House of Representatives of the Philippines
Regionalist parties in the Philippines